Francisco Riveros (born 11 July 1946) is a Paraguayan footballer. He played in four matches for the Paraguay national football team from 1972 to 1975. He was also part of Paraguay's squad for the 1975 Copa América tournament.

References

External links
 

1946 births
Living people
Paraguayan footballers
Paraguay international footballers
Association football defenders
People from Paraguarí Department